Teen Titans Go! is an American animated television series developed by Aaron Horvath and Michael Jelenic for Cartoon Network. It premiered on April 23, 2013, and is based on the DC Comics fictional superhero team. The series was announced following the popularity of DC Nation's New Teen Titans shorts. The production companies of the series are DC Entertainment and Warner Bros. Animation, with the animation outsourced to Canada at Copernicus Studios and Bardel Entertainment.

Sporting a different animation style, Teen Titans Go! serves as a comedic standalone spin-off with little to no continuity to the original Teen Titans series (although some references are included as comedic fan service) or any other media in the DC Comics franchise. Many DC characters make cameo appearances and are referenced in the background. The original principal voice cast returns to reprise their respective roles. This series explores what the Titans do when they are hanging out around the tower.

A feature film, Teen Titans Go! To the Movies, was released in theaters on July 27, 2018.

In 2021, Cartoon Network announced a spin-off series based after the Night Begins to Shine episodes.

Plot
Teen Titans Go! is an animated series that follows the adventures of the young Titans: Beast Boy, Robin, Cyborg, Raven and Starfire. They reside in Jump City when they are not saving the world while living together as teenagers without adults who disrupt the young Titans. Unlike most of the other superhero series, the situations are comic, crazy and parodic—for example, juvenile jokes that reach new heights of danger, obtaining a license to drive after destroying the Batmobile or washing the suits after staining them when fighting their enemies. The show regularly features characters who have appeared in the original series, albeit with reduced roles and/or exaggerated personalities. It also features greater attachment to the DC Universe at large, with more references to other characters including those in the Justice League, plus a few appearances by Batman and Commissioner Gordon in lighthearted moments.

The show expresses in-jokes regarding the whole of DC's library, many of them in blink-and-you'll-miss-it moments, as well as numerous jokes at the expense of the show itself.

Episodes

Characters

Home media

Region 1 DVDs

Main series

Compilations

Blu-ray

Main series

Region 2 DVDs

Main series

Compilations

Reception
Teen Titans Go! has received generally mixed reviews by critics. Common Sense Media gave the show 4 out of 5 stars and wrote that it "manages a few positive messages alongside the clever comedy and characterizations". IGN writer Scott Collura gave the pilot episode a score of 7.8 out of 10, stating that "DC Animation revamps the beloved Teen Titans series for a new generation – with pretty fun results". Randy Schiff of The Buffalo News praised its writing and animation, calling it a "consistently quirky comedy that is often laced with keen social commentary". After the trailer for the series' film adaptation was released, Scott Mendelson of Forbes praised the series and its "nihilistic madness", writing that "Taken on its own terms, it is blisteringly funny and endlessly clever, offering grimly cynical history lessons, comedically grimdark holiday specials, and occasional pure fantasy freak-outs...amid some serious superhero genre trolling and self-commentary". The first season holds an approval rating of 67% based on 9 reviews on review aggregator Rotten Tomatoes.

Writing for Slant Magazine, Lee Wang gave the show 2 stars out of 4, saying "Teen Titans Go! would offer little to even the most ardent Titans nostalgists and completists". Aaron Wiseman of Moviepilot cited various criticisms of the show, noting slight appreciation for the characters of Starfire and Raven. 

The show's pilot episode brought in over 3 million viewers. On June 11, 2013, Cartoon Network renewed Teen Titans Go! for a second season, citing successful ratings. According to Hope King, a tech reporter for CNNMoney, Teen Titans Go! was one out of three of the most viewed television shows and other media to contribute to a record setting 1.3 million simultaneous Xfinity On-Demand viewings during the January 2016 United States blizzard.

Nominations

In other media

Video games
Teen Titans Go! content is featured as part of the toys-to-life video game Lego Dimensions, via two packs released on September 12, 2017. These include a Team Pack containing Beast Boy and Raven minifigures and constructible T-Car and Spellbook of Azarath items; and a Fun pack containing a Starfire minifigure and constructible Titan Robot. The characters are able to access a Teen Titans Go!-themed Adventure World featuring locations from the series, as well as an exclusive episode themed after the game. Additionally, the pre-existing minifigures of Cyborg from DC Comics and Robin from The Lego Batman Movie are able to turn into their Teen Titans Go! counterparts when used in the Teen Titans Go! Adventure World.

Films

A theatrical film adaptation of the series was released by Warner Bros. Pictures and Warner Bros. Animation on July 27, 2018. Titled Teen Titans Go! To the Movies, the film was written by series executive producers and developers Aaron Horvath and Michael Jelenic, and directed by Horvath and fellow producer Peter Rida Michail. The voice cast of the TV series reprise their roles, with Will Arnett and Kristen Bell also starring.

A second film titled Teen Titans Go! vs. Teen Titans was released directly to home media on September 24, 2019.

A third film titled Teen Titans Go! See Space Jam aired on Cartoon Network on June 20, 2021. The film is a crossover with Space Jam as a way to promote Space Jam: A New Legacy.

A fourth film titled Teen Titans Go! & DC Super Hero Girls: Mayhem in the Multiverse, was released directly to home media on May 24, 2022.

Other crossovers with other DC works

Young Justice
Aqualad, Superboy & Miss Martian make an appearance in the season 2 episode "Let's Get Serious".

In the Young Justice: Outsiders episode "Nightmare Monkeys", TTG's animation style was used as the basis of Beast Boy's visions within his mind. Cipes had started voicing Beast Boy during this season of that series as well.

DC Super Hero Girls
The main characters from the series appeared in the crossover episode "Superhero Feud" and appeared in the 4-part crossover event "Space House".

References

External links

Teen Titans Go! on HBO Max

 
2013 American television series debuts
2010s American animated television series
2010s American comic science fiction television series
2010s American parody television series
2010s American superhero comedy television series
2020s American animated television series
2020s American comic science fiction television series
2020s American parody television series
2020s American superhero comedy television series
American animated television spin-offs
American children's animated action television series
American children's animated adventure television series
American children's animated comic science fiction television series
American children's animated science fantasy television series
American children's animated musical television series
American children's animated superhero television series
American flash animated television series
Animated television series about extraterrestrial life
Animated television series about robots
Animated television shows based on DC Comics
Cartoon Network original programming
Crossover animated television series
DC Nation
English-language television shows
Metafictional television series
Teen animated television series
Teen superhero television series
Television series about demons
Television series about shapeshifting
Television series by Warner Bros. Animation
Television series created by Michael Jelenic
Cyborgs in television
Cultural depictions of Mr. T